John Marshall High School is a public high school located in Milwaukee, Wisconsin (United States). John Marshall is part of the Milwaukee Public School system. Formerly a junior-senior high school, the 7th and 8th grades were dropped in 1979 to expand the growing senior high. Recently, the school was redesigned into three divisions: Marshall Montessori IB High School, High School of Sports Education and Employment, and Foster & Williams Visual Communication Campus. As of 2009, the school merged with Samuel Morse Middle School for the Gifted and Talented to form Samuel J. Morse ● John Marshall School for the Gifted & Talented.

Athletics
The school's mascot is the Eagles and the colors are Columbia Blue and Scarlet. The Marshall Eagles have several sports teams including:

Baseball
Basketball
Cross Country
Football
Soccer
Track and Field
Volleyball
Wrestling

The boys cross country team won a state championship in 1970.

Demographics
John Marshall High School's demographics as of 2017–2018 were:
0.1% Native American/Alaska Native, 1 student
6.2%Asian, 50 students
85.0% Black, 681 students
2.6% Hispanic, 21 students
0% Native Hawaiian/Pacific Islander, 0 students
4.5% White, 36 students
1.5% Two or more race, 12 students

Notable graduates
 Mandela Barnes, 45th Lieutenant Governor of Wisconsin, former state legislator
 David Berger, Wisconsin state senator
 David Cullen, Wisconsin state representative and county supervisor
 Floyd Heard, Olympic sprinter
 Derrick Jackson, Boston Globe columnist and 2001 Pulitzer Prize finalist
 Warren Kozak, writer and journalist 
 Shirley Krug, Wisconsin state representative, first woman to become a Democratic Party floor leader in the Wisconsin Legislature
 Mona Sutphen, lobbyist, foreign service officer and White House aide under Clinton and Obama
 George Tillman Jr., filmmaker and television producer
 Mike Taylor, NBA Player
 Michael J. Barber, engineer and Chief Diversity Officer of General Electric

References 

High schools in Milwaukee
International Baccalaureate schools in Wisconsin
Public high schools in Wisconsin
Educational institutions in the United States with year of establishment missing